Batmönkhiin Achbadrakh (born December 21, 1994) is a Mongolian cross-country skier who competed for Mongolia at the 2018 Winter Olympics. He was their flag bearer at the opening ceremony. He also competed in the 2022 Winter Olympics, where he placed 65th in the Men's 15km classic.

References

External links 
 
 

1994 births
Living people
Mongolian male cross-country skiers
Olympic cross-country skiers of Mongolia
Cross-country skiers at the 2018 Winter Olympics
Cross-country skiers at the 2022 Winter Olympics
Cross-country skiers at the 2017 Asian Winter Games
Asian Games competitors for Mongolia
Competitors at the 2015 Winter Universiade